Denmark entered the Eurovision Song Contest 1992 with "Alt det som ingen ser", sung by Lotte Nilsson and Kenny Lübcke after they won the Danish national final, Dansk Melodi Grand Prix 1992.

Before Eurovision

Dansk Melodi Grand Prix 1992 
The Danish broadcaster Danmarks Radio (DR) continued to use the Dansk Melodi Grand Prix format to select the Danish entry for Eurovision.

The 1992 edition of Dansk Melodi Grand Prix was held on 29 February 1992 at the Aalborghallen in Aalborg, hosted by Anne-Cathrine Herdorf and Anders Frandsen. The winner was selected over two rounds of public televoting. In the first round, the top five entries were selected to proceed to the second round. In the second round, the results of the public televote were revealed by Denmark's regions and led to the victory of Lotte Nilsson and Kenny Lübcke with the song "Alt det som ingen ser". The show was watched by 2.52 million viewers in Denmark, making it the most popular show of the week.

At Eurovision
Nilsson and Lübcke performed 18th on the night of the contest, following Ireland and preceding Italy. "Alt det som ingen ser" received 47 points, placing 12th in a field of 23. The contest was watched by a total of 2.2 million viewers in Denmark.

Voting

References

External links
Danish National Final 1992

1992
Countries in the Eurovision Song Contest 1992
Eurovision